The Men's road race H2 cycling event at the 2016 Summer Paralympics took place on September 7 at Brands Hatch. Eight riders from seven different nations competed. The race distance was 56 km.

Results

Men's road race H2